Rutherglen Glencairn Football Club is a Scottish football club based in Rutherglen, South Lanarkshire, near Glasgow. Nicknamed The Glens and formed in 1896, they play at The Hamish B Allan Stadium (New Southcroft Park).

Glencairn currently play in the West of Scotland Football League. Trophy successes include the SJFA West Region Championship in 2018–19, the Stagecoach Central District League Division One championship in the 2008–09 season and the West Region Super League Division One title in 2018–19 and 2009–10. The latter gave the club the right to compete in the West Region Super Premier League for the first time in the 2010–11 season.

The club is currently managed by Willie Harvey and assistant manager Joe Pryce and coached by Stevie Hutchison. It competes in the West of Scotland Football League.

History
 
Rutherglen Glencairn F.C. were formed in 1895 at the 'Old Jail' office in Rutherglen.

The Glens played their first-ever game on 15 August 1896 against the Ibrox XI (Rangers' junior string in those days) and the Glens won 1–0. The Southcroft team joined the Glasgow Junior League and won it in 1899–1900 to take possession of the "Evening Times Trophy".

The Glens' big moment did not arrive until season 1901–02 when they won the Scottish Junior Cup, the Glasgow League Championship, and the Glasgow Exhibition Championship. The team that proudly brought the Scottish Junior Cup to Rutherglen for the first time by beating Maryhill 1–0 at Meadowside is considered one of the greatest ever, including future Scotland senior international forwards Jimmy McMenemy and Alec Bennett, both natives of the town.

It was not until 1918–19 that the Glens won the Scottish Junior Cup again, beating St Anthony's 1–0.

Glencairn's third Scottish Junior Cup win was in season 1926–27 and the satisfaction was all the greater because it was Cambuslang Rangers, their great local rivals, who were defeated 2–1. The Glens won the Scottish Junior Cup again for the last time in season 1938–39 when Shawfield (the other local rivals, from Oatlands) went down 2–1.

Glencairn's recent success has been in their rise through the junior leagues in which they were crowned champions of both the West of Scotland League Central District First Division in 2009 and the West of Scotland Super League First Division in 2010.

In 2020, the club confirmed their intention to leave the separate Junior setup and join a proposed feeder division for the Lowland Football League, part of the pyramid system below the professional level of the Scottish game.

Crest
The current Glencairn crest is heavily influenced from the town of Rutherglen's official blazon and consists of the club's initials with a football centrepiece watched over by guardian angels at each side. Rutherglen's motto  'Ex Fumo Fama' , which translates as 'Fame From Smoke', is incorporated.

Stadium

The club plays its home games at New Southcroft Park in the Burnhill district of Rutherglen, after the original Southcroft Park on Glasgow Road in the town's Shawfield district was demolished in 2007 to make way for the M74 motorway extension into central Glasgow. The original ground had survived for 110 years and was the oldest Junior football ground in Scotland when it closed; the final game was a 1–0 victory over Dunipace in October 2006. Its banked terracing areas also contained toxic Chromium VI, a byproduct from the nearby chemical factory; this was also found to be the case at other stadiums in the local area: Lesser Hampden and Rosebery Park.

The new ground (on the opposite side of the motorway from the original site) was officially opened in July 2008 with a friendly match between Glencairn and Clyde, whose previous home Shawfield Stadium had been just yards from the original Southcroft Park.

In August 2009, the club signed a lucrative sponsorship deal with local urban regeneration company Clyde Gateway to sponsor New Southcroft Park for two years, and it was renamed the Clyde Gateway Stadium. This arrangement was extended for another two seasons in 2012. In 2014 the sponsor became Celsius Cooling Ltd and the ground was duly renamed as The Celsius Stadium. In August 2020 the stadium was renamed 'The Hamish B Allan Stadium' in honour of a lifelong supporter and committee member.

Rutherglen Glencairn entered discussions with Clyde in 2012 about the possibility of sharing the stadium. Although the changing facilities are modern, other things would need improvement to meet Scottish Football League regulations. The proposal was eventually dropped by Clyde in favour of a proposed move to East Kilbride, which was also never realised.

Current squad
Updated 25 January 2022

Club Officials

Club Officials

Management
The management staff of Rutherglen Glencairn as of 25th January 2022 are:

Managerial history

Honours
Scottish Junior Cup
 Winners (4): 1901–02, 1918–19, 1926–27, 1938–39
 Runners-up (2): 1966–67, 1974–75

West of Scotland Super League First Division
Winners: 2009–10, 2018–19

Other honours

West of Scotland League Central District First Division winners: 2008–09
Glasgow Junior League winners: 1898–99, 1901–02, 1918–19, 1921–22
Central League champions: 1933–34, 1942–43, 1966–67
Central League B Division winners: 1974–75
Glasgow Junior Cup winners: 1899–1900, 1923–24, 1934–35, 1937–38, 1942–43
Glasgow Dryburgh Cup winners: 1939–40
Central Junior League Cup winners: 1998–99
Central Sectional League Cup 1991–92, 2007–08

Final league positions

Rutherglen Glencairn's recent final league positions are shown in the table below:

Cup progression

Rutherglen Glencairn's recent cup progress is shown in the table below:

2009–10 championship winning team

After winning the 2008–09 Central District League Championship, Glencairn entered Super League Division One with the almost the same team in 2009–10. They won this too, thus securing a place in the Premier Division for the first time. The 2009–10 winning side was:

Soon after the end of the 2009–10 season, Glencairn's joint managers moved to new managerial positions elsewhere and several players from the 2009–10 team followed them.

Youth Development

Willie Harvey became the new manager before the start of the 2010–11 Super Premier League Season and established under-21 and under-19 teams under youth team manager Alex McArthur. The under-21 team competes in West of Scotland Under 21 League Division One, and the under-19 team in the Cumbernauld & Kilsyth District League. To emphasise the importance of youth development, Harvey said, "Every now and again you find a real gem. Somewhere down the line you will find someone who can have a good, strong career. We want to be the side that clubs are trying to poach players from but at the same time we will have first dibs on the best players coming through."

The 2012–13 season was one to remember for the young Glens. Managers Andy McFadyen and Alex McArthur, as well as coach George Fortheringham, led the 21s to winning the treble, a historic moment for the club. An unforgettable night at Glencairn's home pitch saw a Rutherglen last minute equaliser against Knightswood in the final game of the season clinch the West of Scotland Premier League for the first time in the club's history. The Glens also went on to win the League Cup in style after defeating Goldenhill in a 4–1 encounter played at Shettleston. Finally the boys wrapped up an emphatic season with a penalty shoot out victory against Knightswood in the West of Scotland Cup final.

Notable former players

 Jimmy Bain – Manchester United, Brentford
 Sammy Baird – Clyde, Rangers, Hibernian, Scotland
 Alec Bennett – Celtic, Rangers, Dumbarton, Scotland
 Kenny Campbell – Liverpool, Partick Thistle, Leicester City, Scotland
 Alex Craig – Rangers, Morton, Ireland
 Joe Donnachie – Everton, Oldham Athletic, Scotland
 Rob McKinnon – Hartlepool United, Motherwell, FC Twente, Hearts, Scotland
 Jimmy McMenemy – Celtic, Partick Thistle, Scotland
 Archie McWhinnie - Wrexham A.F.C., Wales
 Archie Robertson – Clyde, Morton, Scotland
 Bernie Slaven – Albion Rovers, Middlesbrough, Republic of Ireland
 Jimmy Soye – Southampton, Aberdeen
 Bobby Ward – Newport County

References

External links
Official club website
Video clip of match at (old) Southcroft Park in 1998
Glencairn team from 'Portfolio of Photos', 1897, hosted by Scottish Junior Football Association website

 
Football clubs in Scotland
Scottish Junior Football Association clubs
Football in South Lanarkshire
Association football clubs established in 1896
1896 establishments in Scotland
Rutherglen
West of Scotland Football League teams